Conobrosis acervata (previously Euchaetis acervata) is a moth of the family Oecophoridae. It is found in Australia.

References

Oecophoridae